An ability is the power an agent has to perform various actions.

Ability may also refer to:

 Aptitude, a component of a competency to do a certain kind of work at a certain level
 Capability (disambiguation)
 Intellectual giftedness, an intellectual ability significantly higher than average
 Intelligence, the ability to perceive, infer, retain or apply information
 Knowledge, a familiarity with someone or something, which can include facts, information, descriptions, or skills
 Potential (disambiguation)
 Power (social and political), the ability to influence people or events 
 Skill, the learned ability to carry out a task with pre-determined results
 Superpower (ability), a popular culture term for a fictional superhuman ability

Ships
 Ability (1878), Australian ketch
 Ability (1910), Australian steamer

Other
 Ability score, in role-playing games
 Ability Plus Software, makers of the office suite Ability Office
 Ability grouping
 Ability (magazine)
 Ability (Fringe), a 2009 episode of the television series Fringe
 Ability (manhwa), a 2012 Manhwa webtoon published in Naver Magazine

See also 
 Capability (disambiguation)
 Capacity (disambiguation)
 Incapacitation (disambiguation)